The Black & Blue Compilation is a compilation album released by Velvet Blue Music in 2000.

Track listing

 "New Tragedy" - Battered Fish
 "You're My Girl" - Pony Express
 "Hello January" - LN
 "The Telephone" - Bon Voyage
 "Schedule" - Reverse
 "Palindromic" - Sal Paradise
 "Sun Ride" - The Gold
 "The Smile Summer Forgot" - MAP
 "Honey Gaze (demo)" - The Denominators
 "Show Me" - The Coleman's
 "Folsom Prison Blues" - The Calicoes
 "You Got Me Good" - Denison Witmer
 "Landscapes" - Phaedo
 "Drowning My Faith" - Jetenderpaul
 "Living with Crickets" - Living with Crickets

External links
 Velvet Blue Music official site
 Velvet Blue Music at MySpace

2000 compilation albums